Celebrity Mastermind is an Australian television quiz show aired on the Special Broadcasting Service (SBS). A spin-off of Mastermind, the series is produced by BBC Studios and is based on the original British game show of the same name created by Bill Wright. The show features an intimidating setting with challenging questions on specialised subjects of the contestant's choice, followed by "slow burn" question and a general knowledge round.

The program was first announced in November 2019, with Jennifer Byrne hosting the first season of the show. Fennell took over as host of the show from the second season, which began in August 2021.

Format 
Episodes consist of three rounds, lining up with the grand final of the original Australian version. In the first round, each contender will have two minutes to answer as many questions as possible about their chosen specialist subject.

The second round, Slow Burn, unique to the Australian version. In Slow Burn, each contestant is assigned a category; they are then presented ten clues, one at a time. The contestant can only make one guess, and the earlier they answer, the more points they earn; ten points if they answer after the first clue, less one for each clue they hear afterwards before answering. Zero points are earned if the answer is wrong. In the third round, contestants face 90 seconds of general knowledge questions.

Episodes

Overview

Series 1 (2020)

Series 2 (2021)

References

External links 
 

English-language television shows
2020 Australian television series debuts
2020s Australian game shows
Quiz shows
Special Broadcasting Service original programming
Celebrity competitions